Plethodontohyla is a genus of microhylid frogs endemic to Madagascar.

Species
There are at present 11 species:
 Plethodontohyla alluaudi (Mocquard, 1901)
 Plethodontohyla bipunctata (Guibé, 1974)
 Plethodontohyla brevipes Boulenger, 1882
 Plethodontohyla fonetana Glaw, Köhler, Bora, Rabibisoa, Ramilijaona, and Vences, 2007
 Plethodontohyla guentheri Glaw and Vences, 2007
 Plethodontohyla inguinalis Boulenger, 1882
 Plethodontohyla laevis (Boettger, 1913)
 Plethodontohyla mihanika Vences, Raxworthy, Nussbaum, and Glaw, 2003
 Plethodontohyla notosticta (Günther, 1877)
 Plethodontohyla ocellata Noble and Parker, 1926
 Plethodontohyla tuberata (Peters, 1883)

Taxonomy
The following species were formerly classed as Plethodontoyhla species but have since been moved to the genus Rhombophryne:
 Rhombophryne coronata (Vences & Glaw, 2003)
 Rhombophryne guentherpetersi (Guibé, 1974)
 Rhombophryne laevipes (Mocquard, 1895)
 Rhombophryne minuta (Guibé, 1975)
 Rhombophryne serratopalpebrosa (Guibé, 1975)
The taxon Plethodontohyla alluaudi was moved to Rhombophryne by Frost et al. in 2006, but was transferred back to Plethodontohyla after review of its taxonomic status in early 2018, along with the newly resurrected Plethodontohyla laevis. In addition, the species Rhombophryne matavy was erroneously transferred to Plethodontohyla in 2016 based on a misidentified DNA sequence, and was later transferred back to Rhombophryne.

References

 
Cophylinae
Amphibian genera
Taxa named by George Albert Boulenger
Endemic frogs of Madagascar